The 9th BET Awards took place at the Shrine Auditorium in Los Angeles, California on June 28, 2009. The awards recognized Americans in music, acting, sports, and other fields of entertainment over the past year.  Comedian, singer, actor Jamie Foxx hosted the event for the first time, which was watched by 10.7 million viewers; the largest audience BET has ever received.



Winners and Nominees 
The nominations were announced May 12, 2009 during 106 & Park's 2009 BET Award Nominations Special.

Michael Jackson tribute
On June 25, 2009, American recording artist and entertainer Michael Jackson succumbed to cardiac arrest just three days before the award ceremony aired. In honor of Jackson, BET announced, through their website, "With the untimely passing of an incomparable legend, the 2009 BET Awards will be shifting gears to honor the late Michael Jackson and his contributions to not only the music industry, but to the entire world. His loss is a difficult one to accept and BET will do its part to ensure that his legacy lives on. The 2009 BET Awards will be dedicated to the life, legacy and legend of music icon, Michael Jackson".

The ceremony began with R&B group New Edition performing a mash up of Jackson 5 hits, including ABC, which gained a standing ovation from the entire audience. Throughout the event, various artists performed covers of Jackson's hit singles, such as Ne-Yo's take on "The Lady in My Life", Ciara's cover of "Heal The World", and Keke Palmer's a cappella version of "Who's Loving You". In addition, many award winners thanked Jackson in their acceptance speeches, such as Lil Wayne, Beyoncé, and Jamie Foxx, who stated, "We want to celebrate this black man. He belongs to us and we shared him with everyone else." Foxx also paid homage by changing into multiple Michael Jackson-inspired outfits, like Jackson's silver glove and red Thriller jacket.

Towards the end of the night, Jackson's younger sister, Janet Jackson, made an emotional, surprise appearance, stating, "To you, Michael is an icon. To us, Michael is family and he will forever live in all of our hearts [...] On behalf of my family and myself, thank you for all of your love, thank you for all of your support. We miss him so much, thank you so much."

References

External links
 Official website

BET Awards